Rosemary is a Malayalam language poet and translator from Kerala, India. She has received many awards including Kerala Sahitya Akademi Award for Overall Contributions in 2019. Her autobiography, Nilaavil Oru Panineerchampa was published in 2021.

Biography
Rosemary, born Maria Goretti, was born on June 22, 1956, in Kanjirappally, Kottayam district to Dr. K.C. Chacko (Pappachan) and Rosamma. She changed her name to Rosemary herself because of the difficulty of pronouncing her birth name. She completed her school education at Gracie Memorial School, Parathode and continued her studies at St. Dominic's College, Kanjirapally, Mar Ivanios College, Thiruvananthapuram, Chidambaram Annamalai University and Thiruvananthapuram Press Club to secure a Master's Degree in English Literature and a Diploma in Journalism. She has worked in the editorial department of the Mathrubhumi daily and as a television correspondent for India Today (Malayalam).

Rosemary lives in Thiruvananthapuram.

Literary career
Rose Mary, who Poet Madhavikutty considered as her successor, published her first poetry collection, Vakkukal Chekkerunnidam was published in 1996. Although she declares herself to be a feminist, she believes her writings do not reflect feminist leanings. She has been a member of several committees such as the Sahitya Akademi Advisory Board and the Central Board of Film Certification.

Works

Poetry collection

Translations
 Children's' literature.
 Children's' literature.
 Children's' literature.
 Children's' literature.
 Children's' literature.
 Children's' literature.
 Children's' literature.
Lokothara BalaKathakal, Malayalam translation of Children's' literature stories from around the world.
Lokaprasaktha Nadodi Kathakal, Malayalam translation of famous folk stories from around the world.
Bible Kathakal, Malayalam translation of stories from holy Bible.
Kahlil Gibran Kavithakal, Malayalam translation of Kahlil Gibran poems.
 She has translated V. K. Krishna Menon's biography into Malayalam.

Memoirs

IvideInganeyum Oral
Chempaka Ennoru Pappathi

Autobiography

Awards and honors
Rosemary received 4th Esenin Award by Esenin Museum, Moscow, the Foundation Russkiy Mir and Russian Cultural Centre, Thiruvananthapuram, in 2012, for introducing many Russian works to Malayalam language. In 2019, She received Kerala Sahitya Akademi Award for Overall Contributions. She is also a recipient of SBT Poetry Award, Muthukulam Parvathy Amma Award and Lalithambika Antharjanam Young Writer Award.

References

External links 
 

1956 births
Malayalam-language writers
Indian women poets
Indian children's writers
Living people
Malayali people
Malayalam poets
21st-century Indian poets
21st-century Indian women writers
Women writers from Kerala
Translators to Malayalam
21st-century Indian translators
Indian women translators
Recipients of the Kerala Sahitya Akademi Award
Indian feminists
People from Kottayam district